Tony Dreyfus (born 9 January 1939 in Paris) was a member of the National Assembly of France from 1997 to 2012.  He represented the city of Paris,  and was a member of the Socialiste, radical, citoyen et divers gauche.

References

1939 births
Living people
Politicians from Paris
Socialist Party (France) politicians
Deputies of the 12th National Assembly of the French Fifth Republic
Deputies of the 13th National Assembly of the French Fifth Republic